Colectiv may refer to:
 Colectiv nightclub fire, fire in Bucharest in 2015, which killed 64 people
 the original title of Collective (2019 film), a 2019 Romanian documentary film directed by Alexander Nanau